When the Devil Drives is a 1922 American silent drama film directed by Paul Scardon and starring Leah Baird, Arline Pretty and Richard Tucker.

Cast
 Leah Baird as 	Blanche Mansfield
 Arline Pretty as Grace Eldridge
 Richard Tucker as John Graham
 Vernon Steele as Robert Taylor 
 Katharine Lewis as 	Nanette Henley

References

Bibliography
 Munden, Kenneth White. The American Film Institute Catalog of Motion Pictures Produced in the United States, Part 1. University of California Press, 1997.

External links

1922 films
1922 drama films
American black-and-white films
Silent American drama films
American silent feature films
1920s English-language films
Films directed by Paul Scardon
Associated Exhibitors films
1920s American films